Notonykia africanae ('African clubhook-squid',) is a species of squid in the family Onychoteuthidae. It is the type species of the genus Notonykia. While the mature size of the species is unknown, it is known to reach a mantle length of at least 180 mm. Tentacles reach approximately 70% of the mantle length, and contain 14-20 club hooks. Arms are known to reach 27-45% (arm I) and 33-55% (arms II-IV) of the mantle length; each containing 50-60 suckers. The species is located in southern waters off Australia, Tasmania, New Zealand and South Africa.

References

External links
 Tree of Life web project: Notonykia africanae

Squid
Molluscs described in 1998